The Adventures of Sally is a novel by P.G. Wodehouse. It appeared as a serial in Collier's magazine in the United States from October 8 to December 31, 1921, and in The Grand Magazine in the United Kingdom from April to July 1922.

It was first published in book form in the United Kingdom by Herbert Jenkins on 17 October 1922, and in the U.S. by George H. Doran on March 23, 1923, under the title Mostly Sally. It was serialised again, under this second title, in The Household Magazine from November 1925 to April 1926.

The novel relates the adventures of Sally  Nicholas, a young American woman who inherits a fortune of $25,000.

Plot
Sally Nicholas is a young, pretty, and popular American woman who lives in a boarding house in New York and works as a taxi dancer. Upon reaching her twenty-first birthday, she inherits a considerable fortune. Sally tries to adjust to her new life, but financial and romantic problems beset her until a happy ending ensues.

References

External links
The Russian Wodehouse Society's page Displays numerous book covers and has a list of characters.
Free eBook of The Adventures of Sally At Project Gutenberg.
 Reviews in www.goodreads.com
Reviews in https://archive.org/
The Adventures of Sally

1922 British novels
Novels by P. G. Wodehouse
Works originally published in Collier's
Novels first published in serial form
Herbert Jenkins books
British comedy novels